Interstate 76 (I-76) is an east–west Interstate Highway in the Eastern United States. This route is not contiguous with I-76 in Colorado and Nebraska.

Just west of Youngstown, I-76 joins the Ohio Turnpike and heads around the south side of Youngstown. In Pennsylvania, I-76 runs across most of the state on the Pennsylvania Turnpike, passing near Pittsburgh and Harrisburg before leaving the turnpike at Valley Forge. At Valley Forge, I-76 becomes the Schuylkill Expressway and eventually enters Philadelphia and then crosses the Walt Whitman Bridge into New Jersey.

Route description

|-
|OH
|
|-
|PA
|
|-
|NJ
|
|-
|Total
|
|}

Ohio
The interchange was previously a double trumpet but was reconstructed in 2010. Officially, I-76 begins at the beginning of the ramp from I-71 north; it merges with US 224 at mile 0.61. After passing through rural Medina County, I-76 enters Summit County and soon crosses State Route 21 (SR 21, old US 21), once the main north–south route through the area until I-77 replaced it, at a cloverleaf interchange. I-76 then passes through Norton and Barberton, then enters Akron; this section of road was built as US 224.

Soon after entering Akron, I-76 turns north onto the short Kenmore Expressway. US 224 leaves I-76 there and continues east with I-277 toward I-77. Shortly after heading north from the I-277 interchange, I-76 meets I-77 and again turns east, joining southbound I-77 south of downtown Akron on the West Expressway. A partial interchange provides access to SR 59, the Innerbelt, and then I-76 crosses through the Central Interchange, where I-77 goes south (on the South Expressway) and SR 8 begins to the north (on the North Expressway); I-76 switches from the West Expressway to the East Expressway.

Leaving the Akron area, I-76 again heads through rural areas, crossing Portage County and entering Mahoning County. West of Youngstown, the freeway intersects the Ohio Turnpike and I-80 via a double trumpet interchange. I-76 joins the Ohio Turnpike heading southeast toward Pittsburgh while I-80 exits the Turnpike and continues east toward Youngstown. The Ohio Turnpike carries I-76 until the Pennsylvania border, where I-76 joins the Pennsylvania Turnpike.

Pennsylvania

Pennsylvania Turnpike

From the Ohio border, the Pennsylvania Turnpike carries I-76 into and across most of Pennsylvania, bypassing Youngstown to the south and Pittsburgh to the north. There is a free interchange with US 19 and I-79 near Wexford. At one point, I-76 used to begin in Pittsburgh on a route that is now signed as I-376, around the 1970s. It intersects with this highway in Monroeville.

From New Stanton to Breezewood, I-76 is concurrent with I-70. In this section are the bypass (built in the 1960s) of the Laurel Hill Tunnel, then the still-in-use Allegheny Mountain Tunnel in a relatively unpopulated section of South Central Pennsylvania, and then an indirect connection with I-99 in Bedford. The highway also passes through a wind farm in Somerset County and is the closest Interstate Highway to the Flight 93 National Memorial in Shanksville.

At Breezewood, I-70 exits the turnpike (making use of a short stretch of the old alignment of the Pennsylvania Turnpike), while I-76 bypasses the Rays Hill and Sideling Hill tunnels along a new alignment built in the 1960s. The major features of this section are more mountains with the Tuscarora Mountain Tunnel and then a double tunnel (Kittatinny/Blue Mountain) prior to Pennsylvania Route 997 (PA 997) near Shippensburg. I-76 intersects I-81 (indirectly) in Carlisle then I-83 and I-283 near Harrisburg, bypassing Harrisburg to the south. The Susquehanna River Bridge is a six-lane bridge that was constructed in 2003 using precast segments that replaced an older bridge across the Susquehanna River. In Morgantown, I-176 provides a connection north to Reading. At Valley Forge, I-76 diverges toward Philadelphia, but the Turnpike (as I-276) bypasses it to the north.

Schuylkill Expressway
 

At Valley Forge, northwest of Philadelphia, I-76 leaves the Pennsylvania Turnpike to run into Philadelphia on the Schuylkill Expressway (while the Pennsylvania Turnpike continues east as I-276). Immediately after exiting the Turnpike, I-76 interchanges with the US 202 and US 422 freeways near King of Prussia. I-76 later crosses I-476 near Conshohocken and begins running along the southwest shore of the Schuylkill River. I-76 then enters the city/county limits of Philadelphia where interchanges provide access to the Roosevelt Expressway (US 1) and the Vine Street Expressway (I-676); the latter runs through Center City Philadelphia while I-76 bypasses to the south.

After the Grays Ferry Avenue exit near University City, I-76 crosses the Schuylkill Expressway Bridge to go toward the South Philadelphia Sports Complex near Lincoln Financial Field, Wells Fargo Center, and Citizens Bank Park.

The last interchange before the Walt Whitman Bridge over the Delaware River into New Jersey is with I-95. Some of the ramps involve traffic signals, as the ramps to I-95 were retrofitted into an existing interchange when I-95 was built, and the tollbooth for the bridge lies west of the crossing of the two roads.

New Jersey

Just after crossing the Delaware River on the Walt Whitman Bridge, I-76 turns south and becomes the North–South Freeway, which carries I-676 north to Downtown Camden; the unsigned Route 76C connector runs east to US 130 and Route 168. The exit numbers in New Jersey are backward, running from east to west. Though signed eastbound toward Atlantic City, the route ends near Gloucester City in western Camden County at an interchange with I-295.

From the exit for I-676 to the end, I-76 originally had local–express lanes in both directions; however, the barriers in both directions have been removed due to rebuilding of the I-295, I-76, and Route 42 interchange. I-76 ends at an interchange with I-295 on the Mount Ephraim–Bellmawr town line. The road becomes Route 42, continuing south on the North–South Freeway and then feeding into the Atlantic City Expressway (ACE) to Atlantic City. While the South Jersey Transportation Authority (which owns the ACE) is not against the idea of making Route 42 (expressway part) and the ACE an eastern extension of I-76, they feel that making the change without a compelling reason would only add to motorists' confusion in southern New Jersey.

History
The majority of I-76 along the Pennsylvania Turnpike includes the first long-distance rural freeway in the US; the Ohio Turnpike and Schuylkill Expressway are also pre-Interstate freeways. By 1955, the section of that route from west of Youngstown to Center City Philadelphia, was included in the planned Interstate Highway System, as was present I-76 from west of Youngstown to Akron. (Some early plans called for a new freeway along SR 14 to the Pennsylvania state line; it is unclear when the proposed route was shifted to the turnpikes.)

In 1957, the route from Cleveland east to Harrisburg, running roughly along the SR 14 corridor in Ohio and the turnpike in Pennsylvania, was labeled I-80, and the rest of the route from Harrisburg to Philadelphia was assigned I-80S. (I-80N would have run from Harrisburg to New York City.) I-78 was assigned to a route from Norwalk, paralleling SR 18 through Akron to Youngstown and turning south there to end at the planned I-80.

However, the 1957 numbering was drawn on a map from 1947, which did not include several changes that had been approved, specifically the Keystone Shortway across Pennsylvania. (The route in that corridor ran further north, along US 6, and was numbered I-84.) Thus, the final numbering, approved in 1958, assigned I-80 to the Norwalk–Youngstown route to reach the Keystone Shortway. The former alignment through Cleveland became I-80N; the turnpike was still not assigned a number from near Elyria (where I-80N and I-90 would split from it) to west of Youngstown. The route from west of Youngstown to Philadelphia was assigned I-80S, and extended east to I-295 in New Jersey when auxiliary Interstates were assigned in 1959. (The planned I-80N in Pennsylvania became I-78.) Initial spurs of I-80S were I-180 (now I-176), I-280 (now I-276), I-480 (now I-476) and I-680 (now I-676, though it swapped with I-76 in 1972).

I-80 was realigned in Ohio by 1962, largely taking over former I-80N, which ran through Cleveland, joining the turnpike southwest of Cleveland. However, while I-80N was planned to split from I-80 near Kent and run northwest to Cleveland along SR 14, the new alignment of I-80 used the turnpike between the crossing west of Youngstown and the crossing with SR 14 at Streetsboro. The former I-80 from near Youngstown west to Akron became part of I-80S, as did a new alignment (already built as US 224) from Akron west to I-71 east of Lodi; the rest of proposed I-80 west to near Norwalk (which would have crossed I-71 near Medina) was removed from the Interstate Highway System. Ca. 1971, I-80 was moved to the Turnpike between Streetsboro and southwest of Cleveland; the old route became I-480.

On April 16, 1963, due in part to the extension of I-79 south from Greater Pittsburgh, Pennsylvania proposed a partial renumbering. A new number, tentatively designated I-76, would run from Downtown Pittsburgh east on what was then I-70 (I-70S bypassed Pittsburgh to the south on what is now I-70) to the Pennsylvania Turnpike at Monroeville, and then east along the remainder of I-80S to I-295. I-80S would remain on the section of turnpikes from west of Youngstown to Monroeville. This was approved February 26, 1964, and included the renumbering of all I-X80 spurs to I-X76.

On June 29, 1970, a renumbering was approved in the Pittsburgh area, with the main effect being rerouting I-79 to bypass Pittsburgh to the west on the former I-279. I-279 was moved to the former I-79 north of downtown, and the former I-79 from downtown southwest to new I-79 became a western extension of I-76. (It was then that I-876 was designated for former I-479.) A realignment and extension of I-76 into Ohio, taking over the rest of I-80S to I-71 east of Lodi, was approved January 11, 1972. The former I-76 from Monroeville west into Downtown Pittsburgh became I-376, and I-279 was extended southwest from downtown along former I-76 to I-79. (I-876 was renumbered to I-579 then.) Signs in Ohio were changed September 1, 1972; the old I-80S signs remained for about a year.

On August 29, 1972, a swap of I-76 and I-676 in Philadelphia and Camden was approved. I-76 had been routed along the Vine Street Expressway and Ben Franklin Bridge (now I-676) through Center City, while I-676 used the Schuylkill Expressway and Walt Whitman Bridge to bypass downtown to the south. The switch was made because of delays in building the Vine Street Expressway, better interchange geometry at the splits, and that the Ben Franklin Bridge ends in city streets, rather than in expressway grade.

The renumbering of a Philadelphia Interstate to I-76 in the years leading up to the Bicentennial Celebration of the 1776 signing in Philadelphia of the Declaration of Independence gives rise to the question of the highway number being an intentional tribute to the Spirit of 1776. US Department of Transportation (USDOT) research into federal documentation of the I-76 renumbering found no evidence of this being intentional.

Exit list
In Ohio and Pennsylvania, the routes are composed mostly of turnpikes with the exceptions in east-central Ohio and the Delaware Valley. The exit numbers on the turnpike portions in Ohio follow the mileage markers for the Ohio Turnpike.

Ohio

Pennsylvania

New Jersey

Auxiliary routes
I-176 runs north from I-76 at Morgantown, Pennsylvania, to US 422 outside of Reading, Pennsylvania.
I-276 runs east from I-76 at Valley Forge, Pennsylvania, along the Pennsylvania Turnpike to I-95 in Bristol Township, Pennsylvania.
I-376 runs west from I-76 at Monroeville, Pennsylvania, through Pittsburgh, Pennsylvania, becomes a toll road northwest of the airport, intersects I-76 again, and terminates at I-80 in Sharon, Pennsylvania.
I-476 begins at I-95 near Chester, Pennsylvania, and heads north, crossing I-76 near Conshohocken, Pennsylvania, and I-276 near Plymouth Meeting, Pennsylvania. From there it continues north on the Pennsylvania Turnpike Northeast Extension to I-81 at Clarks Summit, Pennsylvania, north of Scranton, Pennsylvania. I-476 is the longest auxiliary Interstate.
PA 576 is a planned, partially completed, southern bypass of Pittsburgh, Pennsylvania, though it could become I-576.
I-676 is a loop through Center City Philadelphia and Camden, New Jersey, crossing the Benjamin Franklin Bridge. It runs through several traffic signals in Philadelphia, Pennsylvania, in violation of Interstate Highway standards.
I-876 was the number for present I-579 in Pittsburgh, Pennsylvania, in the early 1970s.
Interstate 76 Alternate is an incident bypass route located in Summit County, Ohio, that runs along SR 21 and I-77 between Norton, Ohio, and Akron, Ohio.
Interstate 76 Connector is an unsigned business route located in Camden, New Jersey, that runs from the I-76 and I-676 interchange to Route 168. It interchanges US 130 before reaching its eastern terminus.

See also

References

Ohio straight line diagrams: Medina Summit Portage Mahoning Mahoning (Turnpike) (PDF)
I-76 (New Jersey) straight line diagram (PDF)

External links

 Interstate 76 (Eastern) at Interstate-Guide.com
 The Roads of Metro Philadelphia: Interstate 76 - New Jersey
 New Jersey Roads - I-76
 I-76 New Jersey at AARoads.com

Interstate 76
 
76 east
76
U.S. Route 30
Interstate 80